
Lac de Salanfe is a lake in the municipality of Evionnaz, Valais, Switzerland. The reservoir is located at an elevation of 1925 m.

It can be reached by 6.5 km-long footpath from Vernayaz.

The dam Salanfe was completed in 1952.

Different major walking trails cross in Salanfe. The two biggest are 'Le tour des Dents du Midi' and the Via Alpina. Many hikers stay the night at the refuge situated next to the lake.

See also
List of lakes of Switzerland
List of mountain lakes of Switzerland

References

External links 

Lakes of Valais
Reservoirs in Switzerland